The 1937 Texas Tech Red Raiders football team represented Texas Technological College—now known as Texas Tech University—as a member of the Border Conference during the 1937 college football season. Led by eighth-year head coach, the Red Raiders compiled an overall record of 8–4 with a mark of 3–0 in conference play, winning the Border Conference title. Texas Tech was invited to the Sun Bowl, where they lost to West Virginia. The team played home games at Tech Field in Lubbock, Texas.

Schedule

References

Texas Tech
Texas Tech Red Raiders football seasons
Border Conference football champion seasons
Texas Tech Red Raiders football